The White Pyramid of Amenemhat II is located in the pyramid field at Dahshur, Egypt, and is now nothing more than a pile of rubble, having been heavily quarried for stone. The remaining limestone rubble has given rise to its modern name.

The pyramid is surrounded by a large rectangular enclosure wall. A number of intact tombs were found inside this enclosure wall belonging to the relatives of Amenemhat II including the tombs of prince Amenemhatankh and princesses Ita, Khnumet, Itaweret and Sithathormeret. A wide variety of funerary furniture was recovered from these tombs including wooden coffins, alabaster perfume jars, and canopic chests. There was also a large quantity of beautiful jewellery in the tombs of Ita and Khnumet.

In 1894 and 1895, Jacques de Morgan dug in the pyramid complex, concentrating on the surrounding royal graves, with other areas not being explored. A full-scale investigation of the whole complex has yet to be undertaken.

See also 
 List of Egyptian pyramids

References

Sources 

 
 
 

Buildings and structures completed in the 19th century BC
Dahshur
Pyramids of the Twelfth Dynasty of Egypt
2nd-millennium BC establishments in Egypt
1894 archaeological discoveries